This list contains games released for the Windows 3.x platform, mostly created between 1989 and 1994. Many are also compatible with the later 32-bit Windows operating systems.

This list contains  game titles.

0–9

A

B

C

D

E

F

G

H

I

J

K

L

M

N

O

P

Q

R

S

T

U

V

W

X

Y

Z

References

Windows 3.x
Windows 3.x